David Cahill (1917 – August 2008) was an Australian actor, writer producer and director, notable for his work directing in TV in the 1950s through to 1970s. It has been argued he was one of the best directors working in Australian TV.

He was an actor and writer. In the mid 1950s he spent time in England.

Select credits
Autumn Affair (1958) (TV series)
Johnny Belinda (1959)
Other People's Houses (1959) (TV movie)
A Tongue of Silver (1959) (TV movie)
Pardon Miss Westcott (1959) (TV movie)
Big Blue and Beautiful (1960) (TV movie)
Reflections in Dark Glasses (1960) (TV movie)
Shadow of a Pale Horse (1960) (TV movie)
The Grey Nurse Said Nothing (1960) (TV movie)
Thunder of Sycamore Street (1960) (TV movie)
Jonah (1962) (TV series)
Pick a Box (1963) (TV game show)
Tribunal (1963–64) (TV series)
The Mavis Bramston Show (1964–68) (TV series)
Casebook (1966–67) (TV series)
You Can't See 'Round Corners (1967) (TV series)
You Can't See 'round Corners (1969) (film)
Phoenix Five (1970) (TV series)
Catwalk (1971–72) (TV series)
Halfway to Nowhere (1972) (TV movie)
The Seven Ages of Man (1975) (TV series)
Kirby's Company (1977) (TV series)

References

External links
David Cahill at Australian Screen Online

David Cahill at National Film and Sound Archive

Australian television directors
1917 births
2008 deaths
People from Sydney
Place of death missing
Place of birth missing